Alice Gaggi (born 8 September 1987) is an Italian female mountain runner, world champion at the 2013 World Mountain Running Championships.

Biography
At individual senior level she won 7 medals (1 gold individual and 6 with the national team) at the World Mountain Running Championships and 5 (1 silver and 5 with the national team) at the European Mountain Running Championships.

National titles
Italian Mountain Running Championships
Mountain running: 2014, 2017 (2)
Italian Long Distance Mountain Running Championships
Long distance mountain running: 2015, 2017, 2018 (3)

References

External links
 

1987 births
Living people
Italian female mountain runners
Italian female long-distance runners
World Mountain Running Championships winners